Lawdar District  is a district of the Abyan Governorate, Yemen. As of 2003, the district had a population of 88,155 inhabitants.

History
In October 2010, riots took place in Lawdar. A convoy of military officers had to be sent in from Hadramaut to maintain order. Dozens have been killed within Lawdar District in conflicts between the jihadists and the army.

References

Districts of Abyan Governorate